XHELPZ-FM is a radio station on 92.7 FM in El Centenario, La Paz, Baja California Sur.

History
XHELPZ began in 1994 as XELPZ-AM, broadcasting on 1310 kHz as a daytimer.

References

Radio stations in La Paz, Baja California Sur